The electronic production of a visual image by ionising radiation on a radiation detector and displayed on a monitor or similar screen.

Radiology